ATMP or aminotris(methylenephosphonic acid) is a phosphonic acid with chemical formula N(CH2PO3H2)3. It has chelating properties. It can be synthesized from the Mannich-type reaction of ammonia, formaldehyde, and phosphorous acid, in a manner similar to the Kabachnik–Fields reaction.

Properties
ATMP has better antiscale performance than that of polyphosphate through its excellent chelating ability, low threshold inhibition and lattice distortion process. It can prevent scale formation in water systems. ATMP is the phosphonate analog of nitrilotriacetic acid.

Applications
 Detergents and cleaning agents
 Water treatment
 Scaling inhibition
 Chelation

References

Phosphonic acids
Chelating agents